The 2007–08 season is FC Vaslui's 6th season of its existence, and its 3rd in a row, in Liga I. In the summer, Adrian Porumboiu revealed that the new coach would be Dorinel Munteanu. He also announced that the team's objective that season, would be a European Cup. FC Vaslui made only 2 transfers in the summer, Bălace and Matei. Also, Petar Jovanović and the team captain Sorin Frunză returned from their loans. FC Vaslui started the season very well, in the second Matchday, beating Liga I champions, Dinamo on their own field, with 2–0. For 2 Matchdays, FC Vaslui was on the 1st place in Liga I. But during the first half, team fatigue appeared, and performance declined. However, in the last match in 2007, FC Vaslui beat once again Dinamo, with 2 beautiful goals scored by Sorin Frunză. In the winter break, N'Doye and Hugo Luz were the only signings. In the Matchday 25, FC Vaslui lost against Steaua, and Adrian Porumboiu accused Dorinel Munteanu that he sold the match to Steaua. Munteanu was sacked, and Bălace, Sabou and Frunză were sent to the second team. Emil Săndoi was named the new coach. With the new coach, FC Vaslui had one terrible final season, having only one victory. In the Matchday 33, FC Vaslui lost the 7th place, who assured UEFA Intertoto Cup, for Oţelul, but TAS decided FC Vaslui to win the match against Oţelul, because they used 2 players suspended. After a 2–4 with Rapid, and a 0–0 draw for Oţelul, FC Vaslui qualified for UEFA Intertoto Cup, this being the team's most important achievement in its short history.

Squad

Transfers

In

Summer

Winter

Out

Summer

Winter

Overall

Spending
Summer:   350,000 €

Winter:   650,000 €

Total:   950,000 €

Income
Summer:   0 €

Winter:   0 €

Total:   0 €

Outcome
Summer:  350,000 €

Winter:  600,000 €

Total:  950,000 €

Statistics

Appearances and goals
Last updated on 28 May 2007.

|-
|colspan="12"|Players sold or loaned out during the season
|-

|}

Top scorers

Disciplinary record

Overall

{|class="wikitable"
|-
|Games played || 35 (34 Liga I, 1 Cupa României)
|-
|Games won || 12 (12 Liga I)
|-
|Games drawn ||  11 (11 Liga I)
|-
|Games lost || 12 (11 Liga I, 1 Cupa României)
|-
|Goals scored || 44
|-
|Goals conceded || 37
|-
|Goal difference || +7
|-
|Yellow cards || 93
|-
|Red cards || 3
|-
|Worst discipline ||  Ştefan Mardare with 9 yellow cards and one red card
|-
|Best result || 4-1 (H) v Gloria Buzău – Liga I – 7 Oct 20073-0 (H) v Dacia Mioveni – Liga I – 23 Feb 20083-0 (H) v Politehnica Timișoara – Liga I – 19 Mar 2008
|-
|Worst result || 0-3 (A) v Universitatea Cluj – Cupa României – 26 Sep 2007
|-
|Most appearances ||  Cristian Hăisan with 34 appearances
|-
|Top scorer ||  Marko Ljubinković (16 goals)
|-
|Points || 47/102 (46.1%)
|-

Performances
Updated to games played on 7 May 2008.

Goal minutes
Updated to games played on 7 May 2008.

Liga I

League table

Results summary

Results by round

Matches

Cupa României
Kick-off listed in local time (EET)

Sixteen finals

FC Vaslui seasons
Vaslui